Cornelia or Pompey the Great, his Fair Cornelia's Tragedy is a 1590 play by Thomas Kyd. The play is about Cornelia Metella, the widow of Pompey. The play ends with Pompey's death and the reactions from his family. Julius Caesar does not appear in person but has a presence throughout. It is an English language adaptation of Robert Garnier's play Cornélie from 1573.

References

External links
 Cornelia at Groundling Press

Plays by Thomas Kyd
1590 plays
Cultural depictions of Pompey
Plays set in the 1st century BC